Redhill is a northern suburb of Bournemouth, Dorset in England.

Geography 
Redhill borders Ensbury Park from the west, Northbourne to the north, Moordown to the west and Winton to the south.

Park 
Redhill is centred on Redhill Park.

Politics 
Redhill is part of the Redhill and Northbourne ward for elections to Bournemouth, Christchurch and Poole Council which elects two councillors.

Redhill is part of the Bournemouth West parliamentary constituency.

References 

Areas of Bournemouth